Ansh: The Deadly Part is a 2002 Bollywood crime thriller film starring Rajat Bedi, Abbas (In his Bollywood debut), Ashutosh Rana and Om Puri.

Plot
This story is about Deputy Superintendent of Police Bhagat Pandey (Om Puri), who is thorough, honest, and has an excellent track record of apprehending criminals. This background creates problems for him with other criminals who are closely connected to powerful politicians. As a result, he is transferred to Bombay (now known as Mumbai). He takes charge of his post, and transforms everything into a diligent and honest policing machine. Unfortunately, politicians and criminals alike do not like his diligence, and talk about transferring him to Kashmir, where he will be killed in an encounter with a terrorist. Bhagat also comes in touch with suspended Police Inspector Sukhdev Singh, and gangleader, Rajnath Guru, the son of a freedom-fighter, Dinanathji (Aloknath). A truly moving movie depicting characters from India's freedom struggle against the British, Raj Guru, Bhagat Singh, and Sukhdev Singh were the ones who fought for freedom again the British, in this kalyuga, the three Rajnath Guru, Bhagat Pandey, and Sukhdev Singh must fight against corruption and their very own lives.

Cast

Abbas as Rajnaath Guru
Om Puri as Bhagath Pandeya
Ashutosh Rana as Sukhdev Singh
Sharbani Mukherji as Shweta
Shama Sikander as Kusum
Rajat Bedi as Munna
Ashish Vidyarthi as Dawoo
Sayaji Shinde as Govind Edda
Milind Gunaji as Babu Bakshi
Alok Nath as Dina Nath ji
Ravi Kishan as Dhoble
Pankaj Berry as Inspector Patil
Ishrat Ali as Bhawani Chaudhary
Mushtaq Khan as M.P. Patel
Yunus Parvez as Yadav
Ram Awana as a gangster

Soundtrack

The music of the film was composed by Nadeem–Shravan. Tracks like " Masoom Chere Ke Kya Baat", "Bich Bajaria" and "Sirf Sunday Ko" became a hit, and are still popular in eastern regions of India like Uttar Pradesh and Bihar.

References

External links
 

2002 films
Films scored by Nadeem–Shravan
2000s Hindi-language films
Indian crime action films
2000s crime action films

Indian gangster films
Films about organised crime in India
Indian action thriller films
Indian thriller drama films
2002 action thriller films
2002 thriller drama films